Mudaliar (alternatively spelled: Muthaliar, Mudali, Muthali, or Moodley ) is a Tamil title and surname. As title, it was historically given to high-ranking military officers and their descendants. The surname is most prevalent among Tamils from Tamil Nadu and Sri Lanka. Descendants of Tamil colonial migrants also bears variants of the name in countries such as South Africa, and elsewhere in the Tamil diaspora. 

The title was primarily used by the communities like the Agamudaiyar, Karaiyar, Sengunthar and Vellalars. Other communities adopted it as means to present themselves as superior to the social status which they actually held.

Etymology
The title is derived from the Tamil word muthal or "muthar" meaning first with the suffix yaar denoting people. The title is used in the same sense as simply meaning headman.

See also 

 Ceylonese Mudaliyars
List of Mudaliars

References

Indian surnames